Esto may refer to:

Esto, Florida
Esto, Kentucky
A brand name for Escitalopram
An Estonian person